The Changsha Ring Expressway, designated as G0401 is an expressway in Southern Central China orbiting the city of Changsha.  This expressway is a branch of G4 Jinggang'ao Expressway.

Detailed Itinerary

References

Expressways in Hunan
Chinese national-level expressways
Transport in Changsha